Two ships of the Royal Australian Navy have been named HMAS Manoora:

, a passenger liner launched in 1934, requisitioned by the RAN in 1939 for use as an armed merchant cruiser and later a landing ship, and returned to her owners in 1949
, an amphibious transport ship acquired from the United States in 1994 and decommissioned in 2011

Battle honours
Ships named HMAS Manoora are entitled to carry seven battle honours:
 Indian Ocean 1941–42
 Pacific 1942–45
 New Guinea 1944
 Leyte Gulf 1944
 Lingayen Gulf 1945
 Borneo 1945
 Persian Gulf 2002

References

Royal Australian Navy ship names